Crump is a medieval English, Danish, Irish, French surname, meaning crippled man.

Crump is an ancient surname of noble Anglo-Norman origin. The name is a derivative of "Crompton", a name given for a medieval town near Shaw, England, for its "crumpled" geographical features.

The name was first given to a branch of descendants of Lord Gislebertus Venator, the "de Crompton" family. Gilbert, being a scion of Blois and cousin-German to the conqueror, was given dominion over the area as a palatine baron for his valiant support in the conquest of 1066.

The first person in the family to use this surname was Sir Piers de Crompton, who was born in 1161 and knighted in 1183 at the age of 22.

Other derivatives of this family name are speculated to include, but are not limited to: Crompe, Crumpton, Crumpe, Cromp, & Krump.

People with this name include
 Barry Crump (1935–1996), a New Zealand writer
 Benjamin Crump, an attorney 
 Brian Crump (born 1938), British cricketer
 Bruce Crump (born 1957), the longtime drummer with the rock band Molly Hatchet
 Buck Crump, CC (1904–1989), a Canadian businessman
 Charles Crump (1840-1923), English footballer, administrator, and referee
 David Crump, Newell H. Blakely Professor of Law at the University of Houston Law Center
 E. H. Crump, former mayor of Memphis
Edwin Samuel Crump (1882-1961), English civil engineer specialising in hydraulics
 George Arthur Crump (1871–1918), a hotelier and golf course architect
 George William Crump (1786–1848), a member of the United States House of Representatives
 Harry Crump (born 1940), a former American football fullback
 Helen Crump, a fictional character on the American TV program The Andy Griffith Show
 James Crump, a curator, writer, producer and director
 Jason Crump (born 1975), an Australian international motorcycle speedway rider
 Jerry K. Crump (1933–1977), a soldier in the United States Army during the Korean War
 John A. Crump, New Zealand-born infectious diseases physician and medical microbiologist
 Josiah Crump (ca. 1838–1890), an American postal worker and politician
 Kevin Crump, Australian murderer and rapist
 Lavell Crump, birth name of American musician David Banner
 Louis Crump (1919–2019), American lawyer and politician
 Marty Crump, American behavioral ecologist
 Mary Eliza Walker Crump (1857-1928), African-American singer
 Phil Crump (born 1952), a former motorcycle speedway rider
 Pleasant Crump (1847–1951), last surviving Confederate soldier of the American Civil War
 Richard Crump, a Canadian Football League running back
Robert Crump, an American cartoonist and musician
 Rolly Crump (born 1930), American designer and Disney Imagineer
 Rousseau Owen Crump (1843–1901), U.S. businessman and politician from Michigan
 S. Scott Crump, the inventor of fused deposition modeling (FDM) and co-founder of Stratasys, Inc.
 Thomas Crump (1845–1907), an English cricketer
 William Crump (disambiguation)

See also
 Covey-Crump (surname)

References